Events from the year 1670 in China.

Incumbents 
 Kangxi Emperor (9th year)

Viceroys
 Viceroy of Zhejiang — Zhao Tingchen
 Viceroy of Fujian — Liu Dou 
 Viceroy of Chuan-Hu — Cai Yurong
 Viceroy of Shan-Shaan — Moluo
 Viceroy of Liangguang — Zhou Youde, Quan Guangzu
 Viceroy of Yun-Gui — Gan Wenkun
 Viceroy of Liangjiang —  Maleji

Events 
 The Kangxi Emperor's Sacred Edict (聖諭) first issued. It consists of sixteen maxims, each seven characters long, to instruct the average citizen in the basic principles of Confucian orthodoxy
 Sino-Russian border conflicts

References

 
 .

 
China